Iridoviridae is a family of viruses with double-stranded DNA genomes. Amphibians, fish, and invertebrates such as arthropods serve as natural hosts. There are currently 22 species in this family, divided among two subfamilies and seven genera.

Nomenclature
The name is derived from Iris, the Greek goddess of the rainbow. This name was chosen because of the "rainbow-like" iridescence observed in heavily infected insects and pelleted samples of invertebrate iridoviruses.
It may refer to any member of the Iridoviridae family or a particular genus within Iridoviridae.

Taxonomy
The following subfamilies and genera are recognized (-virinae denotes subfamily and -virus denotes genus):
 Alphairdovirinae
 Lymphocystivirus
 Megalocytivirus
 Ranavirus
 Betairidovirinae
 Chloriridovirus
 Daphniairidovirus
 Decapodiridovirus
 Iridovirus

Structure
The virions are icosahedral with triangulation number (T) = 189–217, 120–350 nm in diameter and made up of three domains: an outer proteinaceous capsid, an intermediate lipid membrane, and a central core containing DNA-protein complexes. Some of the viruses also have an outer envelope. The presence or absence of an envelope depends on whether they budded from the cell membrane (enveloped viruses) or were arranged in paracrystalline arrays within the host cell cytoplasm and then were released by cell lysis (unenveloped viruses).

The linear genome varies between 150 and 303 kilobases in length. It contains terminal and redundant sequences and is circularly permuted.

Members of this family differ in their degree of genome methylation. The genera Chloriridovirus and Iridovirus lack a highly methylated genome. Members of Lymphocystivirus, Megalocytivirus, and Ranavirus have genomes with about 25% of their cytosine residues methylated by a virally encoded DNA methyltransferase.

Gene expression
Similar to the herpes viruses, transcription occurs in three stages: immediate-early, delayed-early, and late. Positive induction and negative feedback mechanisms exist in each stage, mediated by products of the other stages.

Replication
Virus particles enter the cell and uncoating occurs.  The viral DNA is transported to the host cell nucleus, where it is transcribed by host RNA polymerase II modified by the virus. Meanwhile, host macromolecular synthesis ceases.

Parental DNA produces a genome which is then the template for replication in the cytoplasm. Large concatemers of viral DNA are formed by recombination in the cytoplasm.  Packaging of the new genomes into virions occurs in the cytoplasm and the virus is released either by budding from the cell membrane or cell lysis.

Pathogenesis
Little is known about the pathogenesis of iridoviruses. The pathogenesis is, however, temperature dependent and iridoviruses are thus confined to poikilothermic hosts.

Host range
Members of the Iridoviridae family infect mainly invertebrates, but also some vertebrate species such as fish, amphibians and reptiles.

References

External links

 'ICTV Online (10th) Report: Iridoviridae''
 Viralzone: Iridoviridae

 
Virus families